Sinot božji (English: The Son of God) is the second studio album by the famous Macedonian singer Toše Proeski. The album was released in Macedonia and Serbia & Montenegro by Avalon Production.

Track listing
"Sinot božji" (Son of God)
"Nemir" (Restless)			
"Noḱna igra" (Night Game)
"Vo kosi da ti spijam" (To Sleep in Your Hair)
"Kazna moja si ti" (You are my Punishment)
"Izlaži me uste ednaš" (Lie to Me Once Again)
"Iluzija" (Illusion) 				
"Solzi pravat zlaten prsten" (Tears are Making a Golden Ring)
"Tajno moja" (Secret of Mine)

Release history

Chart positions

Awards
Golden Lady Bug
 The Best Male Singer Of The Year
 Album Of The Year
 Song of the year (Tajno moja)
Slavjanski Bazar
Grand Prix for the song "Iluzija" (Illusion)
Suncane skale
Second prize for the song "Tajno moja" (Secret Mine)

References

Toše Proeski albums
2000 albums
2001 albums